Scarlet or Scarlett, in comics, may refer to:

Scarlet (Icon Comics), a 2010 series from writer Brian Michael Bendis
Scarlet (DC Comics), a sidekick to Jason Todd's Red Hood from Batman and Robin
Scarlett (DC Comics), a 1993 DC Comics series
Scarlett (G.I. Joe), a G.I. Joe character who appeared in the spin-off comics
Mr. Scarlet, a Fawcett Comics superhero later drafted into the DC Universe
Miss Scarlet, a character from the 2000 AD story Stickleback

It may also refer to:

Scarlet Centurion, an alias used by a number of Marvel Comics characters
Scarlet Knights (comics), a Marvel Comics superhero team
Scarlet Scarab, a number of Marvel Comics characters
Scarlet Scorpion, an AC Comics character and member of the Sentinels of Justice
Scarlet Spider, the alias for a number of Marvel Comics characters
Scarlet Traces, a Dark Horse series from Ian Edginton and D'Israeli
Scarlet Witch, a Marvel Comics superhero

See also
Scarlet (disambiguation)
Scarlett (disambiguation)

References